The Minnesota National Guard is a state-based military force of more than 13,000 soldiers and airmen, serving in 61 communities across the state. Operated in the U.S. state of Minnesota, it is reserve component of the National Guard.

The Constitution of the United States specifically charges the National Guard with dual federal and state missions. The National Guard is the only United States military force empowered to function in a state status. Those functions range from limited actions during non-emergency situations to full scale law enforcement of martial law when local law enforcement officials can no longer maintain civil control. The National Guard may be called into federal service in response to a call by the President or Congress.

When National Guard troops are called to federal service, the President serves as Commander-in-Chief. The federal mission assigned to the National Guard is: "To provide properly trained and equipped units for prompt mobilization for war, National emergency or as otherwise needed."

The Governor may call individuals or units of the Minnesota National Guard into state service during emergencies or to assist in special situations which lend themselves to use of the National Guard. The state mission assigned to the National Guard is: "To provide trained and disciplined forces for domestic emergencies or as otherwise provided by state law."

Major units

Minnesota National Guard Joint Force Headquarters
The Minnesota National Guard has units in sixty-two communities statewide. The Minnesota National Guard Joint Force Headquarters is located in the St. Paul Capitol complex.

34th Infantry Division
The Rosemount-based 34th Infantry Division oversees the training and operations of eight National Guard brigades in six different states. Known as the Red Bulls, the 34th Infantry Division is capable of deploying its Main Command Post, Tactical Command Post and Special Troops Battalion in order to provide command and control for Army brigades. 
The 34th Infantry Division fought in World War II and continued the legacy when the division assumed control of U.S. Division – South, Iraq, in May 2009.

The Red Bulls provided command and control of military forces in the southern third of Iraq. The area, known as US Division-South, is geographically about the size of Minnesota and is the largest sector in Iraq. Headquartered at Contingency Operating Base Basra, more than 1,200 Minnesota Citizen-Soldiers led a force of approximately 14,000 U.S. Service members throughout nine of Iraq’s 18 provinces.

1st Armored Brigade Combat Team
The Bloomington-based 1st Armored Brigade Combat Team of the 34th Infantry Division consists of eight major subordinate commands. More than 5,000 Soldiers make up the brigade's combined arms, cavalry, artillery, engineer and brigade support battalions.

Combat Aviation Brigade

The St. Paul-based 34th Combat Aviation Brigade is an Army National Guard unit that supports the 34th Infantry Division and the state of Minnesota by providing aviation capabilities - both UH-60 Black Hawk and CH-47 Chinook helicopters and the C-12 Huron fixed-wing aircraft - for federal and state missions. 
The Minnesota-based subordinate units of the 34th CAB are the 2nd Battalion, 147th Assault Helicopter Battalion, the 834th Aviation Support Battalion, C Company, 1st General Support Aviation Battalion, 171st Aviation Regiment, B Company and C Company of the 2nd Battalion, 211th General Support Aviation Battalion, and F Company, 1-189 Aviation Regt., General Support Aviation Battalion. 
Outside Minnesota, the 34th CAB provides training and operational guidance to the 1st Battalion, 112th Aviation Regiment  of the N.D., the 1st Battalion, 189th Aviation of the Montana and Missouri National Guard and the 1st Battalion, 183rd Aviation Regiment of the Idaho National Guard.

133rd Airlift Wing

The 133rd Airlift Wing is a Minnesota National Guard flying wing headquartered at the Minneapolis - St. Paul International Airport. Utilizing the C-130H Hercules, the wing provides the U.S. Air Force with tactical airlift capability to transport troops, cargo and medical patients across the globe, in addition to providing the citizens of Minnesota with domestic operations and disaster response support. Established in 1921, the 133rd is known as the first federally recognized National Guard flying unit in the country.

148th Fighter Wing

The 148th Fighter Wing, headquartered in Duluth, operates the F-16C Block 50 Fighting Falcon. The full wing structure, which includes the headquarters, communications, logistics, civil engineer, maintenance and security sections, is composed of airmen prepared to rapidly respond to support federal and state missions and community needs.

There are five major units in the 148th FW: Headquarters Group; Maintenance Group; Operations Group; Medical Group; and Mission Support Group.

84th Troop Command

The 84th Troop Command, headquartered in Minneapolis, maintains control of field artillery, military police, engineer and civil support forces, providing a force capable of performing a wide variety of missions. A specialized command with a unique mission, the 84th Troop Command maintains traditional training standards to remain ready to support federal missions in addition to being challenged with the responsibility of conducting domestic operations throughout the state.

A large portion of the 84th Troop Command's domestic operations are the responsibility of the very specific Chemical, Biological, Radiological and Nuclear response capabilities within the 55th Civil Support Team and the CBRN Enhanced Response Force Package.

347th Regional Support Group
The 347th Regional Support Group (RSG) is an Army National Guard brigade headquartered in Roseville that is capable of providing trained and ready combat forces. Additionally, the 347th RSG is prepared to support the State of Minnesota with troops capable of assisting in a disaster.

The mission of the 347th Regional Support Group is to deploy and provide contingency and expeditionary base operations, with responsibilities for managing facilities, providing administrative and logistical support for troop services and ensuring the security of personnel and facilities on a base camp. The brigade provides command and control of assigned units during homeland security, homeland defense and other civil support missions within the U.S. to include managing the reception, staging, onward movement and integration of supporting forces.

175th Regiment (Regional Training Institute)

The Camp Ripley-based 175th Regiment Regional Training Institute provides combat arms, Military Occupational Specialty and leadership training to prepare soldiers and units for deployment at maximum combat readiness levels.

175th Regiment consists of headquarters and two battalions: the 1st Battalion (Officer Candidate School), and the 2nd Battalion (General Studies).

Each year hundreds of Soldiers from across the country travel to the Camp Ripley Training Center to attend one of 31 courses offered by the 175th RTI. The courses offered qualify soldiers as infantrymen, cavalry scouts, health care specialists, wheeled vehicle mechanics and tracked vehicle repairers.

Camp Ripley Training Center
Camp Ripley Training Center, located near Little Falls, Minn., is a  regional training installation featuring ranges and facilities to support military and civilian agency training requirements.

See detailed list of Minnesota National Guard units.

History

1636–1849

The idea of a militia, or body of citizen Soldiers as distinct from career soldiers, was borrowed from England and dates in this country from 1636, when three militia regiments were organized for the common defense in the Massachusetts Bay Colony. Militia companies were eventually organized throughout colonial America, and they provided its principal defense force.

In spite of shortcomings, the various colonial militias became indispensable to the cause of American independence. They were the back-up for General Washington's Continental Army, providing large numbers of armed men when needed on short notice, and they assured the authority of colonial governors against British sympathizers. Later, the United States Constitution and Militia Act of 1792 provided for continuation of a state-based militia system. The federal government could employ the militia for purposes of national security, but its organization was left with the individual states.

1850–1860

Minnesota formed a Territorial Enrolled Militia in 1850, but it only existed on paper until April 1856 when the first uniformed, volunteer company was formed in St. Paul. Called the Minnesota Pioneer Guards, it was a source of such civic pride that soon nine other companies were formed in St. Paul, St. Anthony (Minneapolis) and in river towns from Stillwater to Winona. Minnesota's National Guard traces its beginning to these early militia companies.

1861–1865

When Civil War broke out in April 1861, volunteers from Minnesota's militia formed a nucleus for the first three companies of the First Minnesota Volunteer Infantry Regiment. Both sides in the war had to rely on volunteer regiments, battalions and separate companies recruited by the states. The "First Minnesota" is officially recognized as the senior such regiment in the Union Army because Alexander Ramsey was the first governor to offer state troops to President Lincoln.

The regiment went on to serve with distinction in the Army of the Potomac and became legend as a result of its gallant counter-charge at Gettysburg on July 2, 1863.

During that charge the First Minnesota was ordered to attack. Having run out of ammunition, the Minnesotans, numbering only 262 charged into the leading Confederate brigade, facing overwhelming odds and roughly 1,600 Confederate troops. The fighting was bloody and hand to hand. The Minnesotans gained the time necessary for the Union line to reform, thoroughly demoralising the Confederates. But the cost was great. Of the 262 members of the regiment present for duty that morning, only 47 answered the roll that evening. The regiment incurred the highest casualty rate of any unit in the Civil War, a record still held to this day for any U.S. unit.

On July 3, while rebounding from the horrendous casualties of the previous day, the 47 survivors were reinforced by detached Company F, and the reunited regiment was moved slightly northward on Cemetery Ridge. Destiny placed the remaining Minnesotans at one of the few places where Union lines were breached during Pickett's Charge and required them to charge advancing Confederate troops once again. It is here that Capt. Messick was killed, Capt. W. B. Farrell mortally wounded, and then command fell to Capt. Henry C. Coates.

During the desperate and chaotic fighting, Private Marshall Sherman of Company C captured the colors of the 28th Virginia Infantry and received the Medal of Honor for this exploit. The Confederate flag was taken back to Minnesota as a prize of war and is kept and seldom publicly displayed at the Minnesota Historical Society.

In the mid-1990s, several groups of Virginians threatened to sue the Society to return the 28th Virginia's battle flag to the Old Dominion. The Minnesota Attorney General advised that such threats were without a legal basis, and the flag remains in the possession of the Society.

After being knocked out by a bullet to the head and later shot in the hand, Corporal Henry O'Brien repeatedly picked up the fallen colors of the 1st Minnesota and carried a wounded comrade back to the Union lines. He was also awarded a Medal of Honor for his heroism.

Minnesota eventually organized and recruited volunteers for 11 infantry regiments, two cavalry regiments, a heavy artillery regiment, three light artillery batteries and two sharpshooter companies, totaling 22,000 men. Many of these Soldiers also served on Minnesota's frontier; in fact, hastily organized local militias and detached companies from several volunteer regiments were the only line of defense during Minnesota's Dakota (Sioux) War of 1862.

After the Civil War, the Minnesota Militia re-emerged to become officially known as the Minnesota National Guard. These organizations became a colorful part of community social life but when called upon never failed to deal with civil disturbances and other state emergencies requiring military aid. Annual summer encampments were held at Camp Lakeview on Lake Pepin near Lake City. Control was vested with the state and funding came largely from modest state appropriations and from the members themselves.

1866–1915: The Spanish–American War and Beginnings of Federal Control

Minnesota's National Guard was converted to four U.S. Volunteer Regiments when the war with Spain began in April 1898. Only the Thirteenth Minnesota Volunteer Regiment, however, was destined to see foreign service.  The 13th fought Spanish troops and Filipino revolutionaries in the Philippines from 1898 to 1899.   During the Battle of Manila, the Thirteenth Minnesota Volunteer Regiment, under the command of Major General Arthur MacArthur, were to take the right flank during the battle of Manila.  When it came time to advance on Manila, it was a battalion from the 13th which led the way.  Of all the fighting that day, the most intense combat took place on the right flank with the Minnesotans in the worst of it.  The 13th saw the heaviest fighting during the battle.

The 13th also had the greatest number of casualties, more than all of McArthur’s regiments combined.

The U.S. gained status as a world power as a result of its war with Spain, but the war also called attention to serious military deficiencies. Among them was the nature of the National Guard, which had been functioning, more or less, as a group of autonomous "state armies." Landmark federal legislation in 1903, 1908 and 1916 resulted in federal controls that brought standardization and affirmed the National Guard as the Army's primary organized reserve.

1916–1918

In July 1916, because of border raids conducted by Pancho Villa and the courting of an unstable Mexican government by Germany, President Woodrow Wilson used his new legal authority to mobilize the nation's entire National Guard for patrol duty on the U.S.- Mexican border. The Minnesota Guard was sent to Camp Llano Grande near Mercedes, Texas. Although they never saw fighting, their border duty helped prepare them for a much bigger challenge: World War I.

Barely home from Texas, Minnesota Guardsmen were again mobilized when the United States entered the war against Germany in April 1917. Most went directly to Camp Cody near Deming, New Mexico, for training with a newly organized 34th "Sandstorm" Infantry Division. The 34th consisted of Guardsmen from Minnesota, the Dakotas, Iowa and Nebraska.

The 34th was eventually named as a depot division and broken up. Minnesotans were reassigned and sent to France as individual replacement troops while the division was reorganized and filled with new draftees from the southwest. Fortunately, Minnesota's field artillery regiment remained intact. Redesignated as the 151st Field Artillery, it became part of the 42nd "Rainbow" Division where it fought with great distinction in France.

1919–1940

In the years following World War I, the Minnesota National Guard was preoccupied with reorganization, recruitment and armory construction. Minnesota's 109th Observation Squadron became the first federally recognized air unit in the National Guard in January 1921. In June 1931, a new field training site was opened to troops at Camp Ripley north of Little Falls. It took its name from Fort Ripley, a long-abandoned 19th century army post which, coincidentally, had been located on land purchased for the new National Guard training camp.

The first Air National Guard unit in the nation was the 109th Airlift Squadron, Minnesota National Guard, passing muster inspection on January 17, 1921.

1941–1945

With war threatening in Europe and the Far East, the Minnesota National Guard was mobilized again in February 1941. Most troops went to Camp Hahn, near Riverside, California, for coastal anti-aircraft artillery training or to Camp Claiborne, Louisiana, for training with the 34th Infantry Division.

The 34th (soon to be re-nicknamed as the "Red Bull" Division) became the first American Division to ship for Europe in January 1942. It fought through North Africa (where men of Minnesota's 175th Field Artillery fired the first American shells against the Nazis), and Italy. Brainerd's tank company, after training with its newly organized 194th Tank Battalion at Fort Lewis, Washington, was shipped to the Philippines in September 1941 to shore up American defenses there.

When war broke out in December it fought the Japanese into the Bataan Peninsula and endured the Bataan Death March. The 109th Observation Squadron ended up in Europe where it initially flew Mark V "Spitfires" with the Royal Air Force and, later, reconnaissance missions with P-51 "Mustangs."

The Minnesota National Guard became part of a newly organized 47th "Viking" Infantry Division following World War II, and its Airmen became part of a new Air National Guard.

1946–1953

America again found itself at war in 1950-this time in Korea. In January 1951, as a result of the massive and sudden reinforcement of North Korean forces by Soldiers from Communist China, the Minnesota Guard was again called up. Many of its members were seasoned World War II vets and the 47th Division was selected to serve as a training division for two years during the Korean War. Most of its personnel were eventually reassigned as replacement troops in Korea or Germany. Minnesota's Air Guard was also activated, contributing pilots to Korea's "Mig Alley."

1954–1969

Threats by the Soviet Union to oust Western troops from West Berlin in 1961 prompted the Berlin Crisis and a call-up of selected National Guard forces throughout the nation. Included in this mobilization were members of the 133rd Air Transport Wing, Minnesota Air National Guard, who served in federal active service for 11 months while operating out of their home station at the Minneapolis-St. Paul Airport.

During the Vietnam War, although never officially mobilized, the Air Guard flew hundreds of supply and transport missions to Southeast Asia.

In the 1950s and early 1960 both units of the 179th Fighter Interceptor Squadron in Duluth and 109th Fighter Interceptor Squadron in St. Paul were providing active air defense commitments with 24-hour alert status.

1970–1989

The transition from a Vietnam-era draft to an all-volunteer force had a tremendous impact on the Minnesota National Guard.

1990–1999

Growing tensions in the Persian Gulf erupted in August 1990 when Iraq invaded its neighbor, Kuwait. Within months this oil-rich region experienced the largest deployment of American combat forces since World War II. "Operation Desert Shield," intended to protect Saudi Arabia, became "Operation Desert Storm," when a US-led international coalition used its military to liberate Kuwait and destroy Iraq's army and air force.

Unlike the war in Vietnam, Desert Shield/Desert Storm made heavy use of reservists. About a fourth of all U.S. military personnel called into active duty during the Gulf War were from the National Guard and Reserves. Over 600 Minnesota Guard members volunteered or were activated with their units, including the 109th Aeromedical Evacuation Flight, 109th Light Equipment Maintenance Company, the 1187th Medical Company, and the 257th Military Police Company. The war was over by April 1991, and soon Minnesota's troops headed home.

The 135th Public Affairs Detachment left in June 1996 for Germany to support Operation Joint Endeavor. Originally stationed in Heidelberg, Germany the Minnesota element of the 135th traveled to Eagle Base just outside Tuzla, Bosnia to cover the first free elections since the ending of the war. Later the team moved to "tent city" Steel Castle to support the 1st Armored Division Engineers by reporting stories of maintaining roads, de-mining inhabited areas and providing American military forces with living conditions to allow Soldiers to maintain health and spirit, all contributing to the success of the Balkan mission.

The worst flooding in the state’s history occurred in 1997, and Minnesota National Guard troops were there to assist the citizens of the state. The Guard helped lead and organize search and rescue, security, shelters, medical support, and logistics efforts.

2000–2011

The Minnesota National Guard has been involved in the Global War On Terror since the September 11 attacks in 2001.   Immediately after the attack on New York City and Washington, D.C., Minnesota National Guard F-16 Fighter Jets from the 148th Fighter Wing were providing combat air patrols over key locations. Minnesota Army National Guard troops mobilized to ensure that Minnesota airports were safeguarded.
In January of 2003 Charlie Company 142d Engineers from Camp Ripley were called to deploy to Iraq with their Battalion Headquarters and sister companies from North Dakota.  Charlie Company operated primarily at LSA Anaconda north of Baghdad, and returned home in March of 2004.
In addition to being called upon for the Global War on Terror, the Minnesota National Guard was called upon to provide stability and peace in the Balkans.   Minnesota National Guard troops executed the Bosnia Security Force (SFOR-14) mission 2003-04 and the Kosovo Force (KFOR-5) mission in 2004.

2006 marked the 150th anniversary of the Minnesota National Guard. On April 17, 2006 the House of Representatives of the State of Minnesota congratulated the Minnesota National Guard and honored all the men and women, past and present, who have ever served in the Minnesota National Guard.

Minnesota National Guard forces are heavily involved in the “Long War” to this day. Current operations have troops deployed for Operation Noble Eagle (Homeland Security) and Operation Enduring Freedom (Afghanistan).

Minnesota National Guard in Iraq (2003–2011)

The Minnesota National Guard has played a significant role in the war in Iraq. Since 2003, more than 8,000 Minnesota National Guard Citizen-Soldiers and -Airmen have been deployed to Iraq in support of Operation Iraqi Freedom and Operation New Dawn.

More than 8,000 Minnesota National Guard Citizen-Soldiers and -Airmen deployed to Iraq from 2003 to 2011.

Sixteen Minnesota National Guard Soldiers died in Iraq, and 79 earned Purple Heart Medals due to injuries received in combat.

Sustained military operations in Iraq inspired the Minnesota National Guard to begin the Beyond the Yellow Ribbon program, a ground-breaking process to reintegrate returning Service members back from deployments.

The Minnesota National Guard’s 1st Brigade Combat Team, 34th Infantry Division was an important part of the 2007 “surge.” As a result of the extension of their tour to 16 months in Iraq, and 22 months overall, the Red Bulls are recognized as having served the second longest tour of duty in Iraq of any military unit, active or reserve.

The Duluth-based 148th Fighter Wing expertly provided real-time surveillance for ground commanders using their Theater Aerial Reconnaissance System.

St. Paul’s 34th Combat Aviation Brigade was responsible for corps-level helicopter support from 2008 to 2009.

In 2009-2010, the 34th Red Bull Infantry Division Headquarters provided command and control for 16,000 U.S. military Service members operating in nine of Iraq’s 18 provinces.

With the prevalence of improvised explosive devices on the roadways in Iraq, the St. Paul-based 133rd Airlift Wing provided critical aerial transportation of people, equipment and materiel throughout the region.

In 2011, the 1st Armored Brigade Combat Team, 34th Infantry Division mission in Kuwait was the largest deployment of Minnesota Guardsmen since World War II. The brigade's mission included base management, convoy security, reaction forces, and management of specialized units from the Army, Navy and Coast Guard. The brigade drove 1.35 million miles and escorted 25,970 trucks during 480 missions prior to the last U.S. military convoy departing Iraq.

2012-2019

2020–present

George Floyd protests (2020) 

In mid 2020, the Minnesota National Guard was mobilized in full in response to the George Floyd protests in Minneapolis–Saint Paul. However, the Minnesota National Guard delayed its arrival to areas were unrest was occurring and afterwards received criticism for "lagging" in its response to the riots. After being activated, Minnesota National Guard adjutant general Maj. Gen. Jon A. Jensen claimed he and other guardsman were not provided clear directions by Minnesota Governor Tim Walz on how to respond to the protests and riots. It was noted that no Minnesota National Guardsmen were present during the May 29, 2020 riot which destroyed numerous businesses in Minneapolis and did not clear streets until the next day.

The Minnesota National Guard conducted a security mission alongside local law enforcement as street protests turned violent over the murder of George Floyd. A soldier from the Minnesota National Guard fired his weapon at a vehicle that was speeding towards police officers and National Guard soldiers in Minneapolis. The driver of the vehicle was given several verbal commands, and nonverbal signals in an attempt to slow the driver down. After the driver refused to stop, a soldier fired 3 rounds towards the speeding vehicle. Minnesota National Guard Major General Jon Jensen said "Our soldier fired 3 rounds from his rifle in response to a perceived and legitimate threat to him and the Minnesota police officers he was in direct support of."

By June 7, when the troops demobilized, 7,123 members of the Minnesota National Guard into duty in the largest deployment in the state's history since World War II.

Trial of Derek Chauvin and Daunte Wright protests (2021) 
In early 2021, the Minnesota National Guard was proactively mobilized for protests in Minneapolis regarding the trial of Derek Chauvin that began in March and concurrently responded to protests and unrest over the police-involved killing of Daunte Wright on April 11. Two National Guard soldiers sustained minor injuries after being shot at while sitting in a military vehicle. The two soldiers suffered injuries that included glass fragments in an eye and facial cuts caused by the shattering glass. One soldier was transported to a hospital for treatment. Hennepin County officials charged Andrew Thomas, a 28-year-old man with home address in Minneapolis and Chicago, with first-degree and second-degree assault with a dangerous weapon and illegal weapons possession. In July 2021, Thomas pleaded guilty in Hennepin County court to charges related to the drive-by shooting and illegal possession of a firearm. He received an eight-year sentence that included five years in jail and three years under supervised release.

Adjutants General
List of Adjutants General in Minnesota:

See also
 Minnesota Naval Militia
 Minnesota State Guard
 Minnesota Wing Civil Air Patrol

References

External links

 Camp Cody - Minnesota National Guard WW1
 Bibliography of Minnesota Army National Guard History compiled by the United States Army Center of Military History
 GlobalSecurity.org

 
National Guard (United States)
Military in Minnesota